SailGP is an international sailing competition using high performance F50 foiling catamarans, where teams compete across a season of multiple grands prix around the world. Its reigning champions are Tom Slingsby's Australia SailGP Team, who won their 2nd consecutive title in the 2021–22 SailGP championship.

Background 
The competition was founded by Larry Ellison, founder of Oracle and champion yachtsman Russell Coutts. Their aim was to establish a commercially viable global race series with a large audience. This had been unsuccessfully attempted in the past with series such as the Extreme Sailing Series. The SailGP format uses fast foiling catamarans in a variety of spectacular locations. Teams are currently owned by the competition with the intention of becoming privately owned.

Racing 
The F50 boats used in the competition are one-design boats maintained and operated by SailGP. Technical information is also shared between teams, which includes large amounts of data collected using Oracle systems. This is intended to prevent secret "arms races" that the organizers believe dominate the America's Cup, and to ensure that the outcomes of races are determined by skill and ability, and not technology.

Each SailGP event consists of two days of competitive racing. The first day of racing consists of three fleet races, while the second day consists of two fleet races and a match race final. In the 2019 SailGP championship, the two highest-ranking teams in the event leaderboard qualified for the match race final of that event; in the 2021-22 SailGP championship, the three highest-ranking teams in the event leaderboard qualified for the match race final.

The final race of the season is a match race between the two highest scoring crews over the season, with the winner earning a US$1 million prize. The circuit has been funded for 5 years to allow the competition to become self sustaining. This would see it run until at least 2023.

Scoring

Scoring at events 
Fleet races in each event are scored with the winning team scoring ten points, the second-placed team scoring nine points, and so on. The three highest-ranking teams in the event leaderboard qualify for the match race final of that event.

Scoring in the championship 
The winner of the match race final is awarded ten points in the championship leaderboard, with second and third place being awarded nine and eight points respectively. Teams who did not qualify for the match race final are awarded points corresponding to their rankings in the event leaderboard.

Penalties 
After the 2021 Bermuda Sail Grand Prix, additional penalty rules were put in place to discourage collisions on the race course. Boats that collide during an event accumulate contact and damage points, which result in deductions from the season championship.

Seasons

2019 season

The inaugural competition was in 2019 with six teams competing from Australia, China, France, Great Britain, Japan and the United States of America. The competition consisted of a circuit of five race meets in Sydney, San Francisco, New York, Cowes and Marseille. The Australian team, skippered by Tom Slingsby won the competition and the prize in a final match race against the Japanese team skippered by Nathan Outteridge.

Over the first season SailGP attracted over 133,000 live spectators and had a television audience of 1.8 billion. The five races had a claimed economic impact of US$115 million on their host cities.

2021–22 season

The second season of SailGP introduced two new teams to the sport, with Spain replacing the Chinese team and Denmark joining on as the 7th team. The British team changed as well, signing four-time Olympic Gold medalist and America's Cup skipper Ben Ainslie. The revamped team, introduced members of the original British team and the America's Cup team Ineos Team UK.

This season was scheduled to visit the same venues of the first season but with Marseille swapped out for Copenhagen for the final venue, which coincided with the arrival of the new Danish team. The first round of the season began in Sydney, Australia. On the first day, Ben Ainslie and his British team won the first three races. On the second day of racing, Great Britain won a further race in the fleet races, with Australia taking the final fleet race. In the championship race, Great Britain beat the Australian team, winning them their first event title.

The second round of the 2020 SailGP race was due to be held in San Francisco, in May 2020, however SailGP suspended its season until the end of June 2020. SailGP later delayed the second season until 2021 due to the ongoing COVID-19 pandemic, with points from the Sydney race removed from the championship.

The 2021-22 SailGP championship saw the arrival of the New Zealand SailGP team, skippered by two-time America's Cup winner and 49er gold medallist Peter Burling. The season commenced in April 2021 with the Bermuda Sail Grand Prix, which was won by Ben Ainslie's Great Britain SailGP team. Future venues include Taranto, Plymouth, Aarhus, Saint-Tropez, Cádiz, and Lyttelton Harbour, with the final venue being San Francisco.

Ultimately the season was won by the Australia SailGP team in the final race in San Francisco Bay.

2022–23 season

The third season of SailGP again introduced two new teams to the sport, with Canada and Switzerland joining, and three new venues with the additions of Dubai, Singapore and New Zealand. The venue in Denmark moved from Aarhus to Copenhagen and there will be 2 venues in the United States, Chicago and San Francisco

Teams

2021-2022 SailGP championship 
The 2021–22 SailGP championship saw the addition of the New Zealand SailGP team.

Development rosters 

As part of its diversity, equity, and inclusion initiative, SailGP hosted a series of women's invitational camps that were conducted in each team market. Teams in the 2021-22 SailGP championship were required to train female athletes as part of a trial, with one female athlete then becoming a full member of the team.

The names of athletes selected to become a full member of a SailGP team have been bolded.

2022-2023 sailGP championship 
Thanks to the 4th season of sailGP we saw the addition of women in a lot of teams.

 France

 Spain

 United States

 New Zealand

 Switzerland

 Great Britain

eSailGP 
Since 2019, SailGP also organizes an Esports competition known as eSailGP.

References

External links 

 SailGP website
 SailGP channel on YouTube

 
Recurring sporting events established in 2019
World Sailing Special Events